Big River is a town located on the southern end of Cowan Lake in north central Saskatchewan, Canada. Delaronde Lake is accessed east of the town.

Except for some land cleared for farming and a few natural meadows, the town is surrounded by the northern boreal forest.

History 
Big River began as a company town created as a base for the lumber industry at the turn of the 20th century. Commercial fishing also played a major role in the town in the early years. In 1910 a post office opened in Big River.  It incorporated in 1921.

Demographics 

Big River Regional Park 
Big River Regional Park is a regional park located in the town of Big River that is divided into two sections. At the western end of Main Street, on the eastern shore of Cowan Lake, is Cowan Lake Campground. It has 16 campsites, lake and beach access, modern washrooms/showers, a camp kitchen, a boat launch, a fish cleaning station, and a children's playground. The other campground is located on the north side of town and is called the Community Centre Campground. It has 49 individual campsites as well as group camping, washrooms/showers, ball diamonds, laundry, horseshoe pits, and a playground.

Kitty-corner to the Community Centre Campground is the 9-hole Big River Golf Course. It was built in 1971 and is a 2,935-yard, par 35 grass green course. It has a licensed clubhouse and pro shop.

Education 
There are two schools in the community. Big River Public High School (Grade 7 to 12) & TD Michel Public School (Pre-K to Grade 6).
They are part of the Saskatchewan Rivers School Division #119 out of Prince Albert.

Notable people 
Métis film producer and director Wil Campbell was born here. He helped establish the first video program for Aboriginal people with Alberta Native Communications in 1968 and founded the Dreamspeakers Festival Society and the National Film Board's Native Studio.
 Barry Pederson, former NHL player
 Jim Neilson, former NHL player

See also 
 List of communities in Saskatchewan
 List of towns in Saskatchewan
 Big River Airport
 Big River (Saskatchewan)

References

External links 

Towns in Saskatchewan
Big River No. 555, Saskatchewan